The Rally for Democracy and Unity (RDU) is a political party in Mauritania. The party was founded in 1991, and has been since led by Ahmed Ould Sidi Baba.

The party won 9.6% of the vote of 3 out of 81 seats at the 2001 parliamentary election. At the 2006 elections the party won 3 out of 95 seats.

References

Political parties in Mauritania